Herbert Coffin Jones (September 20, 1880 - March 21, 1970) served in the California State Senate from 1913 to 1931. In 1913 he was the successful candidate for a recall attempt in a Special Election against Marshall Black.

References

External links
Join California Herbert C. Jones

1880 births
1970 deaths
Republican Party California state senators
20th-century American politicians